The 2021–22 Reading F.C. Women season was the club's 15th season and their seventh in the FA Women's Super League, the highest level of the football pyramid.

Season events
On 30 June, Reading announced the signing of Natasha Dowie.

On 5 July, Reading announced the signing of Gemma Evans to a two-year contract.

On 6 July, Reading announced the signing of Faye Bryson to a two-year contract, and that Bethan Roberts had signed her first professional contract with the club, until the summer of 2023.

On 8 July, Reading announced the signing of Chloe Peplow.

On 28 July, Reading announced the signing of Deanne Rose to a two-year contract.

On 5 August, Reading announced that they had extended their contracts with Jeon Ga-eul and Amalie Eikeland for the 2021–22 season.

On 17 August, Reading announced the signing of Justine Vanhaevermaet to a two-year contract.

On 10 December, Kelly Chambers was awarded the manager of the month award for November.

On 17 December, Reading's match against Manchester City scheduled for 19 December, was postponed due to positive COVID-19 cases within the Manchester City squad.

On 21 December, Reading announced the signing of Sanne Troelsgaard Nielsen on a contract until June 2023.

On 27 December, Reading announced that Jeon Ga-eul had left the club.

On 15 January, Reading's match against Arsenal scheduled for 16 January, was postponed on 15 January due to positive COVID-19 cases within the Reading squad.

On 24 January, Reading's match against Manchester City scheduled for 19 December, was rearranged for 16 March.

On 25 January, University of Colorado's women's soccer program, Colorado Buffaloes, announced that Leila Lister would be joining them as a student-athlete.

On 2 February, Reading's match against Arsenal scheduled for 16 January, was rearranged for 2 March.

On 8 February, Reading confirmed that Brooke Chaplen had been ruled out for an indefinite amount of time after a bone tumour had been found in her right leg. On 28 April, Chaplen announced her retirement from football as a result of the successful operation on her right leg.

On 3 May, Reading announced that captain Natasha Harding would be leaving the club at the end of the season.

Squad

Transfers

In

Out

Released

Competitions

Overview

WSL

Results summary

Results by matchday

Results

Table

FA Cup

League Cup

Group stage

Squad statistics

Appearances 

|-
|colspan="14"|Players away from the club on loan:
|-
|colspan="14"|Players who appeared for Reading but left during the season:

|}

Goal scorers

Clean sheets

Disciplinary record

References 

Reading
Reading F.C. Women